Tit for Tat is a 1921 British silent comedy film directed by Henry Edwards and starring Edwards, Chrissie White and Eileen Dennes.

Cast
 Henry Edwards as Roger  
 Chrissie White as Peggy Smith  
 Eileen Dennes as Clove  
 Gwynne Herbert as Auntie  
 Christine Rayner as Cousin Muriel  
 Annie Esmond as Mrs. Speedwell  
 Mary Brough as Gladys Mary Slatterly

References

Bibliography
 Parish, James Robert. Film Actors Guide. Scarecrow Press, 1977.

External links

1921 films
British comedy films
British silent feature films
1921 comedy films
Films directed by Henry Edwards
British black-and-white films
Hepworth Pictures films
1920s English-language films
1920s British films
Silent comedy films